Christine Shevchenko (born 1988) is a Ukrainian-American ballet dancer. She currently performs as a principal dancer with American Ballet Theatre.

Early life
Born in the Odessa, Ukraine, her father was a gymnast, and her mother was a dancer and actor. At age four, Shevchenko started training in rhythmic gymnastics at an Olympic Reserve School in Odessa, under the direction of Nina Vitrychenko. 

When she was eight, her family immigrated to Pennsylvania and enrolled her in The Rock School for Dance Education, under the direction of Bo and Stephanie Spassoff. Shevchenko danced the children's lead (Marie) in Pennsylvania Ballet's The Nutcracker for three years, and was featured in the NBC special, Degas and the Dance.

In 2003, Shevchenko became the youngest recipient of the Princess Grace Award, and she later won several awards at international competitions, including Youth America Grand Prix, USA International Ballet Competition, and Moscow International Ballet Competition.

Shevchenko studied with Lev Assaulyak and Olga Tozyiakova. She also worked with choreographers Fernando Bujones, Benjamin Millepied, Elena Tchernichova, and Vladimir Shoumeikin.

Career

In 2006, Shevchenko joined the American Ballet Theatre Studio Company, where she danced in several classical and contemporary pieces. The following year, she joined the main company as an apprentice and became a full time member of the corps de ballet in 2008. In 2013, when she was still in the corps, Shevchenko replaced an injured Gillian Murphy in Piano Concerto #1. Though she only knew half of the choreography and learned the rest an hour before the show, her performance was praised by critics.

She became a soloist in 2014. In the 2017 Metropolitan Opera House season, Shevchenko debuted as Kitri in Don Quixote, which was her first leading role. The following week, she filled in for an injured dancer as Medora in Le Corsaire, after learning the role during the weekend. She ended the season with her debut in Balanchine's Mozartiana, and was promoted to Principal Dancer later that year. She has since danced other principal roles such as Odette-Odile in Swan Lake, Myrtha in Giselle and Mademoiselle Marianne Chartreuse in Whipped Cream. Shevchenko was coached by Irina Kolpakova at ABT, and had traveled to St. Petersburg to work with Margarita Kullik of Mariinsky Ballet.

Awards
Princess Grace Award, 2003
Bronze Medal in the USA International Ballet Competition in Jackson, Mississippi, 2005 
Gold Medal and Title of Laureate at the Moscow International Ballet Competition
The George Zoritch of Ballet Russe Award for Talent Recognition
Margaret Moore Dance Award, 2010

Repertoire
Shevchenko's repertoire with the American Ballet Theatre includes:

References

External links
 
 Christine Shevchenko at American Ballet Theatre
 Ukrainian page for Christine Shevchenko
 Russian page for Christine Shevchenko

1988 births
Living people
Prima ballerinas
American Ballet Theatre principal dancers
Princess Grace Awards winners
21st-century ballet dancers
Ukrainian emigrants to the United States
Ukrainian ballerinas